"Total Control" is a song by American new wave band the Motels. It was released in 1979 as the second single from their debut studio album Motels. The song failed to make an appearance on the US Billboard Hot 100, but reached number 9 on the Bubbling Under the Hot 100 chart in December 1979. It fared better in Australasia, peaking at number 7 in Australia and 11 in New Zealand. The song has been covered by American singer Tina Turner and Australian singer Missy Higgins.

Background
Speaking of the song in 2000, Davis recalled, "When I wrote this my heart had been broken. I was angry, I wrote a thrash punk rock song, [then] Jeff Jourard came along with this wonderful minimalist chord progression [and] I laid my thrash lyrics on the new progression."

Track listing
US 7" single
 "Total Control" - 3:45
 "Love Don't Help" - 1:56

Charts

Weekly charts

Year-end charts

References

1979 singles
2022 singles
The Motels songs
Missy Higgins songs
Capitol Records singles
1979 songs
Songs written by Martha Davis (musician)